Ulobetasol (INN) or halobetasol (USAN) is a corticosteroid used to treat psoriasis. It is a class I corticosteroid under the US classification and a group III corticosteroid under international classification, the most potent group of such drugs. 

Ulobetasol propionate is usually supplied as a 0.05% topical cream. Ulobetasol is the strongest topical steroid available. It is also sold with tazarotene with 0.01% halobetasol and 0.045% tazarotene as a lotion branded as Duobrii (Bausch Health).

It is available as a generic medication.

References

External links 
 
 
 

Glucocorticoids
Organofluorides
Organochlorides
Alcohols
Ketones
Halohydrins